The Cullin-la-ringo massacre, known historically as the Wills tragedy, was a massacre of white colonists by Indigenous people that occurred north of modern-day Springsure in Central Queensland, Australia on 17 October 1861. Nineteen men, women and children were killed in the attack, including Horatio Wills, owner of Cullin-la-ringo station. It is the single largest massacre of colonists by Aboriginal people in Australian history. In the weeks afterwards, police, native police and civilian posses carried out "one of the most lethal punitive expeditions in frontier history", hunting down and killing up to 370 members of the Gayiri Aboriginal tribe implicated in the massacre.

Massacre
In mid-October 1861, a squatter party from the colony of Victoria under Horatio Wills began a temporary tent camp to start the process of setting up the grazing property of Cullin-la-ringo. The size of the group had attracted much attention from other settlers, as well as the Indigenous people.

It was later reported that the attack on the party was as revenge for the murder of Gayiri men by Wills' neighbour, Jesse Gregson, a squatter from the Rainworth Station nearby, who had erroneously accused the Gayiri of stealing cattle.

According to the account of one of the survivors, John Moore, Aboriginal people had been passing through the camp all day on 17 October 1861, building up numbers until there were at least 50. Then, without warning, they attacked the men, women, and children with nulla nullas. The settlers defended themselves with pistols and tent poles, but nineteen of the twenty-five defenders were killed.

Those killed were Horatio Wills; David Baker, the overseer; his wife,  Catherine Baker; their son, David Baker, Jr.; the overseer's daughter, Elizabeth Baker (aged 19); Iden Baker (a young boy); an infant Baker (8 months old); George Elliott; Patrick Mannion; his wife, Mrs Mannion; their three children (Mary Ann Mannion, 8 years old; Maggie Mannion, 4 years old; and baby Mannion, an infant); Edward McCormac; Charles Weeden; James Scott; Henry Pickering; George Ling; and a bullock driver known as Tom O'Brien (who had been engaged at Rockhampton). A total of 19 people were killed.

The dead were buried at the site of the massacre. Some of the graves have headstones.

The six surviving members were Tom Wills (Horatio's son, noted as an outstanding cricketer and co-founder of Australian rules football); James Baker (David Baker's son); John Moore; William Albrey; Edward Kenny; and Patrick Mahony. These men either were absent from the camp or, in Moore's case, managed to avoid being seen. It was Edward Kenny who subsequently rode on to report the massacre, arriving at Rainworth Station the following day. Moore was the only white eyewitness to the event.

Response

The first to go out in pursuit were a vigilante party of eleven heavily armed white settlers assisted by two trackers. Judging by the more than fifty camp fires, they pursued what was estimated to be "probably not under 300, and of these 100 may be assumed as the number of fighting men".

The Aboriginal people continually used ground that prevented the whites from using their horses to full advantage: "they chose stony and difficult ground wherever they had it in their power". Yet the whites eventually managed to catch up with them on 27 November 1861 and at "half-past two a.m. on Wednesday morning their camp was stormed on foot with success". From this account, the number of Aboriginal casualties was very high, although there was no further detail. Another contemporary account said the police "overtook a tribe of natives, shot down sixty or seventy, and ceased firing when their ammunition was expended". They left the remainder to the native police to take on the next run. Historians later estimated the number of dead as around 370 people, and an anonymous article in the Chicago Tribune was discovered in 2021 stating that Tom Wills had bragged about his participation in reprisal killings. The article was published in 1895, fifteen years after Wills' death. 

In 1862, the  Old Rainworth Stone Store was built at Rainworth Station (also in the Springsure area). It was built from stone in order to reduce threats of fire and to act as a safe haven during an Aboriginal raid as a response to the Cullin-la-ringo massacre.

Legacy
It was the largest massacre of white settlers by Aboriginal people in Australian history, and a pivotal moment in the frontier wars in Queensland.

It

In literature
In Archibald Meston's 1893 short story "The Cave Diary", the narrator relates the story of a fictional Queensland adventurer, Oscar Marrion, based on the contents of a diary found in a cave. After his love interest is murdered in the Cullin-la-ringo massacre, Marrion considers getting revenge on her killers, but abandons the idea after talking to an Aboriginal friend named Talboora.

The first scholarly assessment of the massacre, Gordon Reid's "From Hornet Bank to Cullin-la-Ringo", was published by the Royal Historical Society of Queensland in 1981.

The massacre is central to Alex Miller's 2007 historical novel Landscape of Farewell. The massacre is also explored in fictional accounts of Tom Wills, including Martin Flanagan's 1996 novel The Call, as well as its 2004 stage play adaptation.

See also
Australian frontier wars
List of massacres in Australia

References

Citations

Sources
, a biography of Horatio Wills containing his prolific correspondence
Dillon, Paul (2020). Inside The Killing Fields Hornet Bank, Cullin-la-Ringo & The Maria Wreck , Connor Court Publishing, Brisbane.

Further reading

 

Massacres in 1861
Massacres by Indigenous Australians
History of Australia (1851–1900)
1861 in Australia
Springsure
Mass shootings in Australia
October 1861 events